Embedded intelligence is characterized as the ability of a product, process, or service to reflect on its own operational performance, usage load, or environment. The motivation for this may be to enhance the performance, lifetime, or quality of the product. This self-reflection, facilitated by information collected via embedded sensors, processed locally, or communicated remotely for processing, must be considered from the earliest design stage.

Embedded intelligence depends on a multidisciplinary approach for successful implementation.

Delivering smarter products, systems, or services to industry
Embedded intelligence aims to deliver smarter products, systems, or services to industry through their integration and purposeful use for a given application. This integration can be realized by:

 CONSTRUCTION whereby integrated assemblies show a fusion of technologies, for example in semiconductor integrated circuits and “More than Moore” systems that build directly upon semiconductor devices.
 COMBINATION of functions whereby products are allowed to exploit multiple capabilities for improvements in use. An example would be the touch screen that combines actuation with indication.
 CONNECTION whereby the propagation of information from one product sub-element, system product, or service to another is carried by wires, radio, photonic, or other communication media such as sound or chemical signatures.

Embedded intelligence can serve many purposes:

 The monitoring of the health and usage of products and high-value assets.
 The ease of use of a product, system, or service.
 The market appeal and acceptance where a product becomes fashionable, an example of which would be the tablet which regained popularity by the addition of enhanced services, ergonomic design in terms of shape and functionality, and enhanced aesthetics.
 The ability for a service, system, or product to be used by aging, disabled, or previously socially excluded people.

Applications

Health of high-value assets 
High-value products and assets are deployed across a myriad of industrial sectors, ranging from transport, aviation, power networks, etc. Such assets present significant challenges in terms of their design, operation, and maintenance due to limitations in the visibility of the assets’ health. The ability to monitor these assets is impeded by aggressive ambient conditions influencing sensor drift and failure, power management, and communication issues.

Today's networks for transport (infrastructure, signalling and services in for example train-lines), and power transmission (i.e. smart grid, network management, protection and control) require integrated sensors that can collect reliable information, transmit it securely, and turn it from data-to-knowledge into action to close the loop. That feedback allows the system/product to build resilience and agility.

Intelligent tags in car manufacturing 
When car manufacturers embedded intelligent tags into the majority of their components, temperature, vibration, and other essential data can be harvested throughout the life-cycle of a car. The interrogation of fuzzy Bayesian network ontologies would enable the identification and prediction of faulty components that could be replaced and re-engineered to ensure greater reliability. The ontologies could also determine the genres of cars that need to be recalled - given driving history - thus lowering recall costs and enhancing the consumer experience.

UK government perspective and industry need 
There is an industry need for trained engineers in electronics systems as further growth is striven for within the UK, as delineated in the recently published “Electronics Systems: Challenges and Opportunities” (ESCO Report). This report has brought industry leaders and government together to deliver ambitious growth targets that by 2020 will see a further 150,000 people employed in electronic systems, such as those this CDT aims to provide. The report states that the critical shortages in highly trained and skilled employees can be addressed in part by the provision of Centers of Doctoral Training (CDTs) to fund and train PhD students. The Technology Strategy Board's (TSB) High-Value Manufacturing study also identified strategic themes of “Creating innovative products, through the integration of new materials, coatings,  and electronics with new manufacturing technologies” and “Increasing the global competitiveness of UK manufacturing technologies by creating more efficient and effective manufacturing systems”.

The report identified the need for National Competencies, including “Intelligent systems and embedded electronics”. Additionally through the “Electronics, Photonics and Electrical Systems: Key technology area 2008-2011” report, the TSB are promoting Embedded Systems as a technology that the UK has the high capability and high market potential.

Within Europe, there is significant investment being made through the ENIAC, Artemis, and EPoSS programs that are set to continue into Horizon 2020 and will see close to €5Billion invested over 7 years. The recent Strategic Research Agenda in Smart Systems Integration of the European Technology Platform EPoSS also identified Embedded Intelligence as the key enabler in the design and manufacturing of complex products and services.

Predicted revenue
While it is relatively immature as a technology, the Internet of Things is likely to see the number of connected objects reach 50 billion by 2020. The integration of embedded processors with sensors, intelligence, wireless connectivity and other components with high level operating systems, middle-ware and system integration services is regarded as a new breed of electronics by Intel. They predict that over the next 10 years “IT devices for industries including medical, manufacturing, transportation, retail, communication, consumer electronics and energy will take a development direction that makes intelligent designs become a part of all of our lifestyles”. Accordingly, they forecast a significant growth for embedded systems (CAGR of 18% from 2011 to 2016). Data also reported by IDC forecasts the worldwide value of the embedded systems market to be worth €1.5 trillion in revenue by 2015 with the automotive, industrial, communications and healthcare sectors.

The Internet of Things 
Although the vision for the 'Internet of Things' was first formulated in 1999, the technology road-map is still far from being seamless. The vision of having all objects linked to the internet might be only achievable when technology allows for global adoption. In this regard, Embedded Intelligence is key for these emerging technologies to enable globalization.

See also
 Embedded software

References

External links 
 “Electronics Systems: Challenges and Opportunities” (ESCO Report), June 2013
 “Electronics, Photonics and Electrical Systems: Key technology area 2008-2011” TSB report
 Design of future embedded systems toward system of systems” by IDC, Market Report, May 2012
 ERCIM News, Special theme: Embedded Intelligence, October 2006
 Engineering and Physical Sciences Research Council (EPSRC)
 The Centre for Doctoral Training in Embedded Intelligence

Product development